Jean-Pascal Mignot (born 26 February 1981) is a French former professional footballer who played as defender.

He made the international sporting headlines on 21 October 2010 when he was the first player in the history of the UEFA Champions League to be sent-off without ever actually taking to the field. The incident occurred during a group stage match against AFC Ajax at the Amsterdam Arena. Mignot was warming up on the touchline during the closing moments of the game, and strongly remonstrated against a decision made by the referee, Olegario Benquerenca. The official strode across to Mignot and produced a yellow card, followed swiftly by a red card, after Mignot had continued to speak out of turn.

Personal life 
Jean-Pascal's father Bruno is also a former footballer.

Honours
Auxerre
Coupe de France: 2004-05

Saint-Étienne
Coupe de la Ligue: 2012–13

References

External links

Living people
1981 births
French footballers
Footballers from Rouen
Association football defenders
AJ Auxerre players
AS Saint-Étienne players
FC Sochaux-Montbéliard players
Ligue 1 players